A portable classroom (also known as a demountable or relocatable classroom, portables, bungalows), is a type of portable building installed at a school to temporarily and quickly provide additional classroom space where there is a shortage of capacity. They are designed, so they may be removed once the capacity situation abates, whether by a permanent addition to the school, another school being opened in the area, or a reduction in student population. Such buildings would be installed much like a mobile home, with utilities often being attached to a main building to provide light and heat for the room.  Portable classrooms may also be used if permanent classrooms are uninhabitable, such as after a fire or during a major refurbishment.

Sometimes, the portable classrooms are meant to be long-lasting and are built as "portapacks". A portapack combines a series of portables and connects them with a hallway. Portapacks are usually separated from the main building, but can connect to the school. In most cases, portapacks are accompanied by a few separate portables.

Portable classrooms are also colloquially known as bungalows, slum classes, t-shacks, trailers, terrapins, huts, t-buildings, portables, or relocatables.  In the UK those built during 1945-50 were known as HORSA huts after the name of the Government's post-war building programme, "Hutting Operation for the Raising of the School-leaving Age". Others in the UK are often known as 'prattens' or 'Pratten huts' after the former Prattens company that supplied many of them after World War II.

Occupant health and building durability issues 
Portable classrooms are frequently criticized for presenting mold, moisture, lack of comfort, and unhealthy environment issues. 
However, when portable classrooms are properly set up and operated, experience has shown that they are cheap, and that they can present a very long useful life, with low cost of maintenance, and a productive environment for all occupants.

In the United States, there are approximately 300,000 portable classrooms in use. About half of those are school-owned and of unknown age.  The other half are owned by modular leasing companies and are between 5 and 6 years old on average.

If properly installed and maintained, a portable can have a useful life of approximately 30 to 50 years.  Certain factors impact useful life, including capital improvements and the number of times a unit is relocated.

A portable classroom can be any number of modular sections wide and typically has only a single level, but can be more than two stories high.

See also
 Modular building
 Modular design
 OpenStructures

References

External links

Portable buildings and shelters
Educational facilities
School terminology
Classrooms